Gerold Benz (May 2, 1921 – July 23, 1987) was a German politician of the Christian Democratic Union (CDU) and former member of the German Bundestag.

Life 
In 1972 he was elected to the German Bundestag via the state list of the CDU in Baden-Württemberg. There he was a full member of the Committee for Research and Technology and for Post and Telecommunications. He was directly elected to the Bundestag in the 1976 federal election in constituency 178 (Karlsruhe). He was a full member of the Committee for Research and Technology from 1976 to 1980. He was also a deputy member of the Committee on Home Affairs in both legislative periods.

Literature

References

1921 births
1987 deaths
Members of the Bundestag for Baden-Württemberg
Members of the Bundestag 1976–1980
Members of the Bundestag 1972–1976
Members of the Bundestag for the Christian Democratic Union of Germany